Emilios Kyrou (born 8 November 1959) is a judge of the Court of Appeal, Supreme Court of Victoria, in the Australian state of Victoria. Justice Kyrou was previously a justice in the Trial Division.

Until being appointed, Kyrou was a partner at Mallesons Stephen Jaques (now King & Wood Mallesons), a national firm of solicitors, where he practised mainly in insurance law, government law and dispute resolution. His appointment was announced by the Victorian Attorney General, Rob Hulls, on 5 May 2008 and became effective on 13 May 2008.  Kyrou is the author of a number of leading legal texts, a commentator on law reform and supporter of pro bono work.

Background 
Kyrou was born in 1959 in the village of Sfikia, Imathia, Greece. In 1968, at 8 years of age, he arrived with his family in Australia.  In 1982, he completed a law degree at Melbourne University (where he was an assistant editor of the Melbourne University Law Review). He graduated with first class honours and was awarded the Supreme Court Prize as the top law graduate.

He served articles at Corrs Pavey Whiting and Byrne (now Corrs Chambers Westgarth) and was admitted to practice in April 1984. in 1988, he was made a partner of Corrs before moving to Mallesons Stephen Jaques where he served as a Partner for 17 years before appointment to the bench of the Supreme Court of Victoria.

In 2012, Kyrou published a partial autobiography titled Call Me Emilios about his experiences as a child migrant.

Kyrou is the only Greek-born judge to have been appointed to a superior court in Australia.  He is also the second practising solicitor to be appointed directly as a justice of the Supreme Court of Victoria.

Awards and distinctions 
Since graduating Kyrou has won numerous awards and distinctions. 

In 2015, the President of Greece awarded Kyrou the Gold Cross of the Order of Merit for service to the Greek-Australian community.

In the 2023 Australia Day Honours, he was appointed an Officer (AO) of the Order of Australia "for distinguished service to the judiciary and to the law, to professional associations, and to the community".

See also
 Judiciary of Australia
 List of Judges of the Supreme Court of Victoria
 Victorian Bar Association

References

1959 births
Living people
Greek emigrants to Australia
Judges of the Supreme Court of Victoria
University of Melbourne alumni